Jewel's Reward (March 10, 1955 – September 16, 1959) was a Thoroughbred Champion racehorse. He was voted the American Champion Two-Year-Old Colt of 1957 by the Thoroughbred Racing Association and Turf & Sports Digest magazine. The rival Daily Racing Form poll was topped by Nadir. Owned by the Maine Chance Farm of "Cosmetics Queen" Elizabeth Arden, Jewel's Reward was trained by National Museum of Racing and Hall of Fame inductee Ivan Parke.

Following his championship year, in which he won more money than any other two-year-old in history, at age three Jewel's Reward was ranked a top contender for the U.S. Triple Crown series after winning the Wood Memorial Stakes at Belmont Park in Elmont, New York. However, an injury during a workout hampered the colt  and after being sent off as the betting favorite, he ran fourth in the Kentucky Derby and seventh in the Preakness Stakes. Later that year, Jewel's Reward was sent to race in California, where he was trained by Bill Molter.

Returned to the East Coast, in August 1959 the four-year-old Jewel's Reward came down with colic and died on September 16 in his barn at Belmont Park.

References

1955 racehorse births
1959 racehorse deaths
Racehorses bred in Kentucky
Racehorses trained in the United States
American Champion racehorses
Thoroughbred family A11